About Time: Einstein's Unfinished Revolution, published in 1995, is the second book written by Paul Davies, regarding the subject of time. His first book on time was his The Physics of Time Asymmetry (1977)(). The intended audience is the general public, rather than science academics.

About Time explores selected mysteries of spacetime, following on from Albert Einstein's theory of relativity, which Davies believes does not fully explain time as humans experience it. The author explains 

The book delves into the nature of metaphysics, time, motion and gravity, covering a wide range of aspects surrounding the current cosmological debate, across 283 pages in great detail. It includes an index, a bibliography, and numerous diagrams.

See also
 Basic introduction to the mathematics of curved spacetime
 Sense of time
 The Mind of God
 How to Build a Time Machine, 2002 fiction book by the same author

References

1995 non-fiction books
Science books
Physics books
Time in fiction
Books by Paul Davies